Evgeny Yarovenko (born 17 August 1963) is a Soviet, Kazakhstani, and Ukrainian retired professional footballer and current manager of Sumy.

Personal life
He is the father of Ukrainian footballer Oleksandr Yarovenko.

Career statistics

References
 http://www.rusteam.permian.ru/players/yarovenko.html
 http://www.uefa.com/competitions/euro/teams/team=65146/kindstatic=2/index.html 
 Profile at TFF.org

External links
 
 

1963 births
Living people
People from Jambyl Region
Kazakhstani people of Ukrainian descent
UEFA Golden Players
Association football defenders
Kazakhstani footballers
Soviet footballers
Soviet Union international footballers
Olympic footballers of the Soviet Union
Footballers at the 1988 Summer Olympics
Olympic gold medalists for the Soviet Union
Soviet Top League players
Soviet First League players
Süper Lig players
TFF First League players
Ukrainian Premier League players
FC Taraz players
FC Kairat players
FC Dnipro players
FC Rotor Volgograd players
FC Metalurh Zaporizhzhia players
FC Kryvbas Kryvyi Rih players
Sarıyer S.K. footballers
FC Nyva Ternopil players
FC Vorskla Poltava players
Kazakhstani expatriate footballers
Expatriate footballers in Turkey
Expatriate footballers in Finland
Expatriate footballers in Ukraine
Expatriate footballers in Russia
Kazakhstani football managers
FC Torpedo Zaporizhzhia managers
FC Naftovyk Okhtyrka managers
FC Kontu players
Olympic medalists in football
FC Energiya Volzhsky players
Kazakhstani expatriate football managers
Kazakhstani expatriate sportspeople in Ukraine
Kazakhstani expatriate sportspeople in Finland
Kazakhstani expatriate sportspeople in Turkey
Kazakhstani expatriate sportspeople in Russia
FC Taraz managers
FC Shakhtar-3 Donetsk managers
FC Peremoha Dnipro managers
FC Nikopol managers
FC Sumy managers
Medalists at the 1988 Summer Olympics